Wyllie is a surname. Notable people with the surname include:

 Adrian Wyllie (born 1970), American political activist, radio personality, and investigative journalist
 Alex Wyllie (born 1944), New Zealand rugby union player and coach
 Andrew Wyllie (pathologist), Scottish pathologist
 Bill Wyllie (1932–2006), Australian businessman 
 Bob Wyllie (1929–1981), Scottish footballer
 Curzon Wyllie (1848–1909), Indian army officer
 Daniel Wyllie (born 1970), American actor
 Douglas Wyllie (born 1963), Scottish rugby player and coach
 Edward Wyllie (1848–1911), American medium
 George Wyllie (1921–2012), Scottish artist
 George Wyllie (GC) (1908–1987), British Army soldier and recipient of the George Cross
 Hugh Wyllie (born 1934), Moderator of the Church of Scotland
 James Wyllie (1818–1899), Scottish draughts player
 Kate Wyllie (1840s−1913), New Zealand tribal leader
 Meg Wyllie (1917–2002), American actress
 Peter John Wyllie (born 1930), British petrologist and academic 
 Robert Crichton Wyllie (1798–1865), Scottish physician and businessman
 Ross D. Wyllie (born 1944), Australian singer and television presenter
 Thomas Wyllie (1872–1943), Scottish football player
 Tony Wyllie (born 1967), American NFL executive
 Tu Wyllie (born 1954), New Zealand politician and rugby player
 William Wyllie (disambiguation)

See also
 Wiley (disambiguation)
 Wily (disambiguation)
 Wylie (disambiguation)
 Wylye (disambiguation)
 Wyle (disambiguation)
 Willey (disambiguation)
 Wyle (disambiguation)
 Wyly